Ayako Nakano may refer to:

, Japanese ballerina
, Japanese swimmer